The October 2017 Democratic Party held a presidential election on 31 October 2017 to choose a replacement for the previous president Seiji Maehara. Maehara resigned on 30 October 2017 after the failure of his election strategy in the 2017 general election.

Kohei Otsuka was the only candidate in the race and therefore was elected as the new president unopposed.

Candidates

Running 
Kohei Otsuka, member of House of Councillors for Aichi and former vice minister in the Hatoyama and Kan administration.

Potential 
Renhō, member of the House of Councillors for Tokyo, former party president (2016–2017) and cabinet minister.
Toshio Ogawa, member of the House of Councillors for Tokyo and former Minister of Justice (2012).

Results 
As Otsuka was the only candidate, there was no vote held and he was elected unopposed.

References 

2017 elections in Japan
Political party leadership elections in Japan
October 2017 events in Japan
Democratic Party (Japan, 2016) leadership election